An academic is a member of the academy.

Academic or Academics may also refer to:

Academic personnel

Entertainment
The Academic, Irish indie rock band
"Academic", song by New Order from the album Music Complete (2015)

Other uses
Academia (disambiguation)
Academy (disambiguation)
Faculty (disambiguation)